ΔΣΠ (Delta Sigma Pi) is a co-ed professional business Fraternity in the United States of America. It was founded on November 7, 1907 at the School of Commerce, Accounts and Finance, New York University, New York, New York and is currently headquartered in Oxford, Ohio.  The Fraternity currently has 57 active alumni chapters.

Alumni Chapter List 

Albany Upstate New York - Albany, NY
Albuquerque Duke City - Albuquerque, NM
Angelo Concho Valley - San Angelo, TX
Arlington Area Lone Star - Arlington, TX
Atlanta - Atlanta, GA
Austin - Austin, TX
Baton Rouge-Red Stick - Baton Rouge, LA
Birmingham-Magic City - Birmingham, AL
Boston - Boston, MA
Central Florida - Orlando, FL
Chicago - Chicago, IL
Cincinnati - Cincinnati, OH
Cleveland-Akron - Cleveland, OH
Columbia - Columbia, SC
Dallas Area - Dallas, TX
DC Metro - Arlington, VA
Denver - Denver, CO
Des Moines-Central Iowa - Des Moines, IA
Detroit-Motown - Detroit, MI
Farmington South Metro - Farmington, MN
Fort Worth Cowtown - Fort Worth, TX
Fresno-CenCal - Fresno, CA
Grand Rapids - Grand Rapids, MI
Greenville/Upstate SC - Greenville, SC
Hawaii - Hilo, HI
Honolulu-Oahu - Honolulu, HI
Inland Empire - Riverside, CA
Jacksonville - Jacksonville, FL
Jersey City-New Jersey Area - Jersey City, NJ
Kansas City - Kansas City, MO
Kingsville - Kingsville, TX
Lincoln/Greater Nebraska - Lincoln, NE
Long Beach-Pier 9 - Long Beach, CA
Los Angeles - Los Angeles, CA
Louisville - Louisville, KY
Memphis - Memphis, TN
Miami/Fort Lauderdale - Miami, FL
Nashville - Nashville, TN
New Orleans-Crescent City - New Orleans, LA
New York City - New York, NY
Oklahoma City Tornado Alley - Oklahoma City, OK
Orange County - Orange, CA
Phoenix-Thunderbird - Phoenix, AZ
Pittsburgh - Pittsburgh, PA
Pomona Valley - Pomona, CA
Reno Sierra Nevada - Reno, NV
Richmond - Richmond, VA
Sacramento Valley - Sacramento, CA
San Antonio - San Antonio, TX
San Francisco Bay Area - San Francisco, CA
Seattle-Pacific Northwest - Seattle, WA
Shepherdstown - Shepherdstown, WV
Space City Houston - Houston, TX
St Pete-Clearwater - St Pete-Clearwater, FL
St. Louis - St. Louis, MO
Twin Cities - Minneapolis, MN
West Palm Beach - West Palm Beach, FL
Winona-LaCrosse - Winona, MN

Outstanding Alumni Chapter Winners 

The Outstanding Alumni Chapter Award is presented on an annual basis to the alumni chapter of Delta Sigma Pi which, through its actions and activities, best promotes the aims and ideals stated in the Purpose of the Fraternity.

References

Lists of chapters of United States student societies by society
Alumni chapters